The 1969 Wightman Cup was the 41st edition of the yearly women's team tennis competition between the United States and Great Britain. It was held at the Cleveland Arena in Cleveland, Ohio in the United States.

References

1969
1969 in tennis
1969 in women's tennis
1969 in American tennis
1969 in British sport